Neighborhoods of Richmond may refer to:
Neighborhoods of Richmond, Virginia
List of neighborhoods in Richmond, Virginia
List of Richmond, California neighborhoods